On Disobedience and Other Essays is a 1981 book by the psychoanalyst Erich Fromm. Published by Harper & Row, it is a collection of four previously published essays.

"Let Man Prevail" and "Humanist Socialism" originally appeared in Erich Fromm, Let Man Prevail: A Socialist Manifesto and Program, 1960
"Disobedience as a Psychological and Moral Problem" originally appeared in Clara Urquhart, A matter of Life, 1963
"Prophets and Priest" originally appeared in Ralph Schoenman, Bertrand Russell, Philosopher of the Century: Essays in His Honour, 1967

1981 non-fiction books
English-language books
Essay collections
Harper & Row books
Philosophy books
Psychology books
Works by Erich Fromm